Pangnirtung (or Pang, also Pangniqtuuq, in syllabics: ᐸᖕᓂᖅᑑᖅ ) is an Inuit hamlet, in the Qikiqtaaluk Region of the Canadian territory of Nunavut, located on Baffin Island. Pangnirtung is situated on a coastal plain at the coast of Pangnirtung Fjord, a fjord which eventually merges with Cumberland Sound. As of January 2022, the mayor is Stevie Komoartok.

Name
There is some confusion about the village name. Residents say the real name is Pangniqtuuq, which means "the place of many bull caribou". Early in 2005 residents voted against officially changing the name of the village to the native one, as Pangnirtung has achieved an international reputation. Its residents have created high-quality traditional arts in sculpture, as well as adaptation of themes and design in printmaking and weaving.

Pangnirtung is nicknamed the Switzerland of the Arctic, or simply Pang.

History
The Inuit and their ancestors have inhabited the area for thousands of years, perhaps up to 4000 years. Their cultures became well-adapted to the climate and environment.

Contact with European Canadians has been limited to less than the last century. In 1921, the Hudson's Bay Company established a trading post in Pangnirtung. Two years later, the Royal Canadian Mounted Police erected a permanent office. The first government-appointed teacher arrived in 1956. The first administrative office was established in 1962.

Since then, numerous Inuit have achieved success with marketing their traditional arts. They transformed traditional drawing skills to produce lithographs and other forms of prints, allowing reproduction and wider distribution of their work. Other artists have made sculptures and carvings in local stone. Since the government established a weaving studio in 1970, many Inuit have learned to weave and are producing tapestries and other works that find an international market.

Demographics 

Economic development
The community operates a turbot fishery. In 2008, the federal government budgeted for the construction of a harbour. Pangnirtung Fisheries Limited operates a packing plant to process local turbot catches. Founded in 1992 during peak summer operations the company has over 40 employees during peak season.

Auyuittuq Lodge is the hamlet's only hotel, which comprises 25 rooms, shared facilities, a dining room, and a lounge.

Local services 
Power is supplied to Pangnirtung via stand alone diesel generators operated by Qulliq Energy.

Fuel is imported via tanker and stored in a tank farm near the Pangnirtung Airport. The purchase of diesel fuel is the responsibility of the government of Nunavut.

Water, sewage, and garbage services are provided by the municipality of Pangnirtung. Water trucks fill up at a reservoir adjacent to the hamlet and is delivered seven days a week. Sewage is pumped out and treated at the municipal treatment plant. Garbage is picked up five days a week and transported to a landfill that slowly deteriorates due to Arctic temperatures.

For emergency services it is protected by the 14 member Pangnirtung Fire Department. The fire service uses one pumper with one older reserve from one station. Policing is provided by the Royal Canadian Mounted Police Pangnirtung Detachment attached to V Division.

Mini C, The North West Company (Northern Store), Pangnirtung Inuit Co-op and Co-op Express are the only local retailers and grocery options. KFC Express, Pizza Hut and Co-op Express are the only fast food restaurants in the hamlet. Perishable goods are shipped by air and all other items by sealift when waters are ice free.

Banking is done through the Co-op or money orders

Gas for cars or snowmobile is done at the Quickstop or the Co-op.

Education
There are two schools in Pangnirtung:
 Alookie Elementary School - kindergarten to Grade 5
 Attagoyuk Ilisavik High School - Grades 6 to 12

Post secondary-studies opportunities can be made through Nunavut Arctic College's Community Learning Centre.

Recreation
Aksayuk Arena is a sports and recreational centre.

Transportation 
Like all Nunavut communities Pangnirtung is a fly-in community with no road access to the rest of Nunavut. Pangnirtung Airport provides the only viable means of access. There are gravel roads in the community and residents use SUV's, pickup trucks, 4-wheel ATV's and snowmobiles.

Places of worship
Two churches can be found in Pangnirtung:
 St. Luke's Anglican Church
 Full Gospel (Pentecostal) Church

Health
Basic medical services are available at the Health Centre. Four beds are available for assessment only, with advance care via medevac to Iqaluit.

Nearby Pangnirtung 
Pangnirtung is the nearest town (1 hour by boat) to Auyuittuq National Park and the location of one of two park offices, the other is in Qikiqtarjuaq. Located near to the Parks Canada office is the Angmarlik Visitor Centre.

Small craft harbour
In 2009, the then Canadian Prime Minister, Stephen Harper, proposed building a new modern harbour in Pangnirtung to support the region's turbot-fishing industry. Harper received a warm welcome with many residents gathered at the airport to greet him. The town's 1,500 residents listened as Harper announced that $17 million worth of harbour construction promised in the last two budgets would get under way in the fall of that year. Harper said the greatest potential for the hamlet's future lies in the inshore turbot fishery. The shortfalls of the previous harbour were a big problem for fishermen: When the tide receded, the harbour turned to mud.

The work on the harbour was completed in September 2013. The entire project ended up costing about $40.5 million. The improvements to the harbour include a fixed wharf, breakwater, marshalling area, sea lift ramp and a dredged channel and basin. The improvements will allow residents to unload their catches faster by allowing smaller crafts to dock easily and safely.

Broadband communications 
The community has been served by the Qiniq network since 2005. Qiniq is a fixed wireless service to homes and businesses, connecting to the outside world via a satellite backbone. The Qiniq network is designed and operated by SSI Micro. In 2017, the network was upgraded to 4G LTE technology, and 2G-GSM for mobile voice.

In popular culture
The 2022 Canadian Inuit science fiction film Slash/Back was filmed in Pangnirtung. It was directed by Nyla Innuksuk in her feature debut, and starred largely local actors recruited for the film.

Notable residents

 Elisapee Ishulutaq
 Simeonie Keenainak
 Ipeelee Kilabuk
 Peter Kilabuk, Nunavut's first Minister of Education
 Nakasuk
 Paul Okalik, Nunavut's first premier
 Stephen Osborne
 Andrew Qappik
 Riit

Image gallery

See also
List of municipalities in Nunavut

References

Further reading

 Arnaktauyok, Germaine. Stories from Pangnirtung. Edmonton: Hurtig, 1976. 
 Dale, Janis Elaine. The Relationship between the Physical Environment and Benthic Faunal Communities in Pangnirtung Fiord, Baffin Island, N.W.T. Ottawa: National Library of Canada = Bibliothèque nationale du Canada, 1993. 
 Ebisuda, Ken-ichi, Takashi Kunito, Reiji Kubota, and Shinsuke Tanabe. 2002. "Arsenic Concentrations and Speciation in the Tissues of Ringed Seals (Phoca Hispida) from Pangnirtung, Canada". Applied Organometallic Chemistry. 16, no. 8: 451.
 Hankins, Gerald W. Sunrise Over Pangnirtung The Story of Otto Schaefer, M.D. Komatik series, no. 6. Calgary: Arctic Institute of North America of the University of Calgary, 2000. 
 Langmark, Otto C. A., and C. O. Langmark. The Top of Baffin Island 140 Mountain Peaks (and Other Topographic Features) Around the South End of Pangnirtung Fjord, Baffin Island, N.W.T. [Thornhill, Ont.?]: Otto Langmark & Associates, 1990. 
 Neuman, Cheryl Lynn McKenna. Aeolian Processes and Landforms in South Pangnirtung Pass, Southeast Baffin Island, N.W.T., Canada. Ottawa: National Library of Canada, 1988. 
 O'Hara, Charles. Tourism and the Social Construction of Place A Case-Study of Tourists' Spatial Practices in Pangnirtung, Nunavut. Ottawa: National Library of Canada = Bibliothèque nationale du Canada, 2001. 
 Tarnocai, C., and Hugo Veldhuis. Soils and Trafficability of Pangnirtung Pass, Auyuittuq National Park Reserve. Ottawa: Research Branch (ECORC, BRC), Agriculture and Agri-Food Canada, 1998.

External links

 Uqqurmiut Inuit Artist Association
 Hamlet of Pangnirtung official website.
Geoffrey Secord photo collection of Pangnirtung (1953-1955)
Fur trade post under construction, Pangnirtung Fiord 1921

Populated places in Baffin Island
Hudson's Bay Company trading posts in Nunavut
Ports and harbours of Nunavut
Hamlets in the Qikiqtaaluk Region
Road-inaccessible communities of Nunavut